State Route 21 (SR 21) is a  state highway that extends from the Florida state line, near Atmore in Escambia County to Piedmont in Calhoun County. The route travels almost the entire length of the state from the northeast to the southwest. It is the longest signed state route in Alabama.

Route description

Starting at the northern terminus of Florida State Road 97 at the Florida state line south of Atmore, the route travels north through Atmore, passing under an intersection with Interstate 65 at exit 57, then enters Monroe County and travels northeast through Frisco City and Monroeville and is concurrent with SR 47 for part of this section. SR 21 then once again becomes a standalone route passing through Beatrice and Oak Hill. In Lowndes County, SR 21 begins its first concurrency with US 80, and the two highways enter Montgomery, the state capital, from the southwest. SR 21 then diverges northeastward from US 80 for a short concurrency with US 31, then travels concurrently with US 80 once again (as well as US 82) around the Montgomery city center, diverging from US 82 at US 231 and traveling concurrently with US 231 northward to Sylacauga at an interchange with US 280. From Sylacauga, SR 21 turns northeastward toward Talladega. The route travels close to the Talladega National Forest and the Talladega Superspeedway. From here, SR 21 continues generally northeastward through the cities of Oxford, Anniston, and Jacksonville before terminating at an intersection with U.S. Highway 278 in Piedmont. The route is paved throughout and often multi-lane.

Major intersections

See also

References

Rand McNally: The Road Atlas 2002, Rand McNally and Company 2001

External links

Southeastroads.com web page on SR-21 with photos

021
Highways in Montgomery, Alabama
Transportation in Escambia County, Alabama
Transportation in Monroe County, Alabama
Transportation in Wilcox County, Alabama
Transportation in Lowndes County, Alabama
Transportation in Montgomery County, Alabama
Transportation in Elmore County, Alabama
Transportation in Coosa County, Alabama
Transportation in Talladega County, Alabama